Papilio nireus, the green-banded swallowtail, narrow-banded blue swallowtail, or African blue-banded swallowtail, is a butterfly of the family Papilionidae. It is found in Sub-Saharan Africa.

Description
Forewing above at most with two blue submarginal spots in cellules 7 and 8; rarely in the 
female with several yellow ones; the blue (male) or greenish (female) median band is 2-7 mm broad at the hindmargin of the forewing and 4—12 mm in the middle of the hindwing, and is only a little widened posteriorly; the spot in cellule 2 of the hindwing does not completely cover the base of the cellule and the narrow spot in cellule lc does not reach the cell; forewing beneath almost always entirely without submarginal spots. [Nominate] Median band of the forewing above well developed, the spots of cellules 2—4 obliquely cut off distally; the discal spot in cellule 2 of the hindwing is very long and produced farther towards the anal angle than the spot in cellule 1 c. Sierra Leone to Angola and Uganda. — lyaeus Dbl. The median band narrower, but complete; the spot in cellule 2 of the hindwing is shorter and does not reach so far towards the anal 
angle as the one in 1 c. Larva above green, beneath whitish, with a whitish oblique longitudinal streak at each side on segments 7 and 8 and a girdle of ring-shaped spots on the third segment. Cape Colony to Angola and British East Africa. male ab. aelyus Suff. only differs from lyaeus in the discal spot in cellule 1 a of the forewing being entirely wanting and the one in cellule 1 b divided into two; German East Africa.— pseudonireus Fldr. (= donaldsoni Em. Sharpe). The median band is altogether absent on the forewing or is only represented by a few very small spots; on the hindwing it is formed as in lyaeus. Somali¬ land and Abyssinia.

Biology 
It flies year-round, with peaks from November to February.

The larvae feed on Calodendrum capense, Vepris species, and Citrus species.

Subspecies
Listed alphabetically:
P. n. lyaeus Doubleday, 1845 –  narrowly green-banded swallowtail (Sudan, Uganda, Kenya, Tanzania, Malawi, Zambia, Mozambique, Zimbabwe, Botswana, Namibia, South Africa, Swaziland)
P. n. nireus Linnaeus, 1758 – (Senegal, Gambia, Guinea-Bissau, Guinea, Burkina Faso, Sierra Leone, Liberia, Ivory Coast, Ghana, Togo, Benin, southern Nigeria, Cameroon, Equatorial Guinea, Gabon, Congo, Angola, Central African Republic, Democratic Republic of the Congo, Uganda, western Tanzania, Zambia)
P. n. pseudonireus C. & R. Felder, 1865   – (northern Kenya, northern Uganda, southern Sudan, Somalia, Ethiopia, Eritrea)

Taxonomy
Papilio nireus belongs to a clade called the nireus species group with 15 members.  The pattern is black with green bands and spots and the butterflies, although called swallowtails, lack tails with the exception of Papilio charopus and Papilio hornimani. The clade members are:
Papilio aristophontes Oberthür, 1897
Papilio nireus Linnaeus, 1758
Papilio charopus Westwood, 1843
Papilio chitondensis de Sousa & Fernandes, 1966
Papilio chrapkowskii Suffert, 1904
Papilio chrapkowskoides Storace, 1952
Papilio desmondi van Someren, 1939
Papilio hornimani Distant, 1879
Papilio interjectana Vane-Wright, 1995
Papilio manlius Fabricius, 1798
Papilio microps Storace, 1951
Papilio sosia Rothschild & Jordan, 1903
Papilio thuraui Karsch, 1900
Papilio ufipa Carcasson, 1961
Papilio wilsoni Rothschild, 1926

References

 Carcasson, R.H. (1960) "The Swallowtail Butterflies of East Africa (Lepidoptera, Papilionidae)". Journal of the East Africa Natural History Society pdf Key to East Africa members of the species group, diagnostic and other notes and figures. (Permission to host granted by The East Africa Natural History Society)
 Hancock, David Lawrence. (1984) The Princeps nireus group of swallowtails (Lepidoptera: Papilionidae): systematics, phylogeny and biogeography. Arnoldia Zimbabwe 9(12):181-215.

External links

 Linnean collections Photographs of the holotype

nireus
Butterflies described in 1758
Butterflies of Africa
Taxa named by Carl Linnaeus